"Left, Right, Left" (also known as "Left/Right") is the lead single released from Drama's debut album, Causin' Drama. The song was produced by Shawty Redd, with Drama both co-producing and writing it.

The song peaked at #73 on the Billboard Hot 100, #18 on the R&B chart, and #2 on the rap chart.

Track listing
"Left, Right, Left" (Radio Version) - 3:36 
"Left, Right, Left" (Instrumental) - 3:37 
"Left, Right, Left" (Street Version w/o Intro) - 3:36 
"Left, Right, Left" (Clean Acapella) - 3:28

Chart positions

Weekly charts

Year-end charts

References

Atlantic Records singles
1999 debut singles
Drama (rapper) songs
Music videos directed by Jeremy Rall
Song recordings produced by Shawty Redd
Gangsta rap songs
1999 songs